Polimá Ngangu Eduardo Miguel Orellana (born August 29, 1997), known professionally as Polimá Westcoast, is a Chilean rapper and singer. His musical style is defined as Latin trap and reggaeton. He is one of the better known figures of the Chilean urban music scene that emerged in the late-2010s. He had his first underground hit with the song "Brokeboi" in 2018. In 2019 Polimá Westcoast presented a show at Lollapalooza Chile and toured the country soon after.

In 2022 he released the single "Ultra Solo" which charted #1 in the Chilean Billboard list by late June.

References 

1997 births
Chilean people of African descent
Chilean rappers
Latin trap musicians
Living people
Reggaeton musicians
Spanish-language singers